The Organization for Understanding Cluster Headaches (O.U.C.H.) was a 501(c)(3) non-profit organization that assisted cluster headache sufferers and their families by providing information and emotional support. O.U.C.H. also supported and participated in research and communicated with the medical and pharmaceutical communities with the goal of improving diagnosis and treatment of cluster headaches.

The UK equivalent, Organisation for the Understanding of Cluster Headache or OUCH (UK), is a registered charity.

The Belgian equivalent, Organisation for the Understanding of Cluster Headache Belgium or OUCH Belgium is the same non-profit organization for Belgium.

History
O.U.C.H. was incorporated in Texas on 9 December 1999.

On 7 April 2012, it was announced that the organisation was shutting down, stating that "Recently, membership interest has dropped, volunteerism is low and there is no apparent interest in serving on the Board of Directors.  The current Board cannot continue alone, and per our by-laws, and with no membership support or volunteers for office, we must close the OUCH doors."

OUCH Belgium was created in May 2008.

References

External links
 OUCH 

Non-profit organizations based in Texas
Patients' organizations
Organizations established in 1999
1999 establishments in Texas